Emissary was a popular early commercial internet suite from Attachmate for Windows. It featured a web browser, FTP support, e-mail program, a newsreader program, and an HTML editor.

Though once considered a popular internet suite, it fell out of favor after Internet Explorer 3 was released. Development was abandoned following the Microsoft antitrust case.

Releases
The following are releases of Emissary 1.x:
 Emissary 1.0
 Emissary 1.1

Emissary 2.0
Emissary 2.0 was a collection of six applications:
 File Management - An FTP client
 Host Access - Remote access via TELNET
 Mail - An email client with POP3 and SMTP support as well as an address book
 News - A newsgroup reader
 Web Surfing -  An HTML 3 web browser
 Hypertext editor - A WYSIWYG HTML editor

Each of these applications ran within Emissary and had its own helpfile.

Features
Emissary 2.0 had the following features:

Technical
Web pages created with Emissary had the following meta tag: <META NAME="GENERATOR" CONTENT="Emissary 2.0">

Emails sent with Emissary had the following X-Mailer Header: X-Mailer: Emissary V2.00, by Attachmate Corp.

Releases
 Emissary 2.0 Public Beta 
 Emissary 2.0 Public BETA 1
 Emissary 2.0 beta 1 
 Emissary 2.0 beta 2 
 Emissary 2.0 beta 3 
 Emissary 2.0 beta 4 
 Emissary 2.0 International Evaluation
 Emissary 2.0 Desktop Edition
 Emissary Version 2.0 Official Release [90-day evaluation]

System Requirements
Emissary 2.0 has the following system requirements:

 Processor: An IBM PC 80486 or higher
 Ram: 8MB of RAM
 Hard drive space: 15MB to 25MB free hard drive space
 Driver: WinSock v1.1-compliant TCP/IP stack.
 Network: an ODI or NDIS-compatible network card (for intranet use)
 Modem: 28.8kbit/s or faster modem (for internet use)

Reception
The internet suite was well received.

Editions
The following are the editions that were sold:

References

Further reading
 Messaging Solutions, IT Solutions

External links
 
 Emissary 2.0 International Evaluation, Evolt.org
 Emissary 2.0 FTP Mirror (defunct download), mirror
 Stroud's Review of Emissary, Mecklermedia Corporation

Discontinued internet suites